Gregory A. Presnell (born November 10, 1942) is a senior United States district judge of the United States District Court for the Middle District of Florida.

Education

Presnell received his Bachelor of Arts degree (economics) from the College of William & Mary in 1964. He received his Juris Doctor from the Fredric G. Levin College of Law at the University of Florida in 1966. He was in private practice in Orlando, Florida from 1966 until 2000, serving also for part of that time in the United States Army Reserve from 1967 to 1973.

District Court service

On June 8, 2000, he was nominated by President Bill Clinton to a new seat on the United States District Court for the Middle District of Florida established by 113 Stat. 1501. He was confirmed by the Senate on July 21, 2000, and received his commission on July 31, 2000. On April 1, 2012, he assumed senior status. He was succeeded by Judge Sheri Polster Chappell.

Notable cases

In the 2006 case Avista Management, Inc. v. Waussau Underwriters Insurance Company, Judge Presnell ordered the representatives of the two parties to compete in a game of "rock, paper, scissors" to determine which party could select the location for a pre-trial deposition, a matter he considered should have been trivially simple to come to agreement on. Presnell's comments on the crack/powder sentencing disparity were also noted by the media in that year.

In October 2016, he dismissed the H-1B visa lawsuit that two IT workers brought against Disney for  outsourcing their jobs.

References

External links

1942 births
20th-century American judges
21st-century American judges
College of William & Mary alumni
Fredric G. Levin College of Law alumni
Judges of the United States District Court for the Middle District of Florida
Living people
People from Tampa, Florida
United States Army reservists
United States district court judges appointed by Bill Clinton